Open Source Ecology (OSE) is a network of farmers, engineers, architects and supporters, whose main goal is the eventual manufacturing of the Global Village Construction Set (GVCS). As described by Open Source Ecology "the GVCS is an open technological platform that allows for the easy fabrication of the 50 types of industrial machines that it takes to build a small civilization with modern comforts". Groups in Oberlin, Ohio, Pennsylvania, New York and California are developing blueprints, and building prototypes in order to test them on the Factor e Farm in rural Missouri. 3D-Print.com reports that OSE has been experimenting with RepRap 3-D printers, as suggested by academics for sustainable development.

History 
Marcin Jakubowski founded the group in 2003. In the final year of his doctoral thesis at the University of Wisconsin, he felt that his work was too closed off from the world's problems, and he wanted to go a different way.  After graduation, he devoted himself entirely to OSE.

OSE made it to the world stage in 2011 when Jakubowski presented his Global Village Construction Set TED Talk. Soon, the GVCS won Make magazine's Green Project Contest. The Internet blogs Gizmodo and Grist produced detailed features on OSE. Jakubowski has since become a Shuttleworth Foundation Fellow (2012) and TED Senior Fellow (2012).

Open Source Ecology is also developing in Europe as OSE Germany. This is an independent effort based on OSE's principles.

In 2016, OSE and the Open Building Institute joined forces to make affordable, ecological housing widely accessible. The initiative has prototyped the Seed Eco-Home – a 1400 square foot home with the help of 50 people in a 5-day period – demonstrating that OSE's Extreme Manufacturing techniques can be apply to rapid swarm builds of large structures. Materials for the Seed Eco-Home cost around US$30,000 in 2016, though the cost went up to approximately US$50,000 in 2022 due to rising lumber prices. Further, OBI has prototyped the Aquaponic Greenhouse – which was also built in 5 days with 50 people.

Factor e Farm 
The Factor e Farm is the headquarters where the machines are prototyped and tested.  The farm also serves as a prototype. Using the Open Source Ecology principles, Four prototype modules have been built as a home.  An added greenhouse demonstrates how a family can grow vegetables and fish.  Outside, there is also a large garden including fruit trees.

Current progress

For 2020, OSE was planning its most ambitious collaborative design effort by hosting an Incentive Challenge on the HeroX platform – to produce a professional grade, open source, 3D printed cordless drill that can be manufactured in distributed locations around the world. This project is intended to provide a proof-of-concept for the efficiency of open source development applied to hardware – in addition to its proven success with software. This effort was postponed due to COVID-19, and OSE has pivoted to a product release of the Seed Eco-Home in 2021 to address the need for affordable, ecological housing.

In 2019, OSE updated its vision to collaborative design for a transparent and inclusive economy of abundance.  This reflects a shift from open source to open source and collaborative design. OSE began running its Open Source Microfactory STEAM Camps to emphasize the vision of collaborative design of real products.

In 2018, the project achieved 33% completion.

In 2014, 12 of the 50 machines were designed, blueprinted, and prototyped, with four of those reaching the documentation stage.

In October 2011 a Kickstarter fundraising campaign collected US$63,573 for project expenses and the construction of a training facility.  The project has been funded by the Shuttleworth Foundation and is a semifinalist in the Focus Forward Film Festival.

Awards and recognition
 From 2012 to 2014, Dr. Jakubowski was awarded a Shuttleworth Foundation Fellowship.
 In 2011, the project won the Green Project Contest organized by Make magazine.
 It was one of the 21 semi-finalists for the Buckminster Fuller Challenge, among 162 participants.
TIME magazine rated OSE's Civilization Starter Kit as a top invention of the year 2012.

List of machines 

The Global Village Construction Set (GVCS) comprises 50 industrial machines:

GVCS replication
The first time a Global Village Construction Set product was created by another group was in October, 2011; Jason Smith with James Slade and his organization Creation Flame developed a functioning open source CEB press.

See also 

 3D printing
 Eco-cities
 eXtreme Manufacturing
 Fab lab
 Free software
 Ivan Illich – seminal figure in de-institutionalizing of education and appropriate modern technology
 List of open-source hardware projects
 Long Now Foundation
 MakerBot
 Maker culture
 Open design
 Open source
 Open-source hardware
 Open-source appropriate technology
 Open-source movement
 RepRap – a free and open-source software (FOSS) 3D printer
 Sustainable city
 The Knowledge: How to Rebuild Our World from Scratch (book)
 The Open-Source Lab: How to Build Your Own Hardware and Reduce Research Costs
 Transition towns – a grassroots network of communities that are working to build resilience in response to peak oil, climate destruction, and economic instability.

References

External links
 TED Talk on the Global Village Construction Set
 
 Open Source Ecology: Wiki
 Open Source Ecology: Blog
 Open Source Ecology (OSE) Europe
 NPR: Building A Village Starts With Building The Tractor
 Bloomberg Businessweek:The Post-Apocalypse Survival Machine Nerd Farm

Environmental organizations based in the United States
Open hardware organizations and companies
Engineering projects
Free software
Modular design
Design
Articles containing video clips
Open-source movement